Prince Jacob (born Miguel Jacob Carmo Luis Fernandes; 16 July 1960) is a popular tiatrist and singer from Goa, India. He is dubbed as "the most famous man in Konkani Comedy".

References

Singers from Goa
Living people
Konkani-language singers
Tiatrists
1960 births
People from Margao